CCTV Building may refer to: 
 China Media Group Headquarters, the old CCTV headquarters and now served as the headquarters for China Media Group on Fuxing Road.
 CCTV Headquarters (CMG Office Block at Guanghua Road), the new CCTV headquarters on Guanghua Road.